7P may refer to:

7P
 7P/Pons-Winnecke, comet
 Batavia Air, IATA-Code, Indonesian Airline
7p, an arm of Chromosome 7 (human)
 7P, a Classification of steam locomotives by British Railways, denoting a locomotive rated for the largest of Passenger trains
7P, the production code for the 1989 Doctor Who serial Survival

7Ps
 Seven Ps marketing terminology

See also
P7 (disambiguation)